Dendromecon, the tree poppy, is a genus of one or two species of shrubs to small trees, native to California and northern Baja California.

The leaves are evergreen, alternate, lanceolate to ovate, 3–10 cm long. The flowers are yellow, satiny, and shed after pollination.

Species
Two species of Dendromecon are widely accepted, though some botanists consider them to belong to just one species, only distinct at the lower rank of subspecies:

References 
Flora of North America: Dendromecon
  Jepson Manual Treatment - Dendromecon

External links

Papaveroideae
Papaveraceae genera
Flora of California